Carlos Rivera (born 1986) is a Mexican singer.

Carlos Rivera may also refer to:

 Carlos Rivera (baseball) (born 1978), Major League Baseball first baseman
 Carlos Rivera (footballer) (born 1979), Panamanian football defender
 Carlos Rivera Flores (born 1989), Mexican football player
 Carlos A. Rivera (born 1987), Argentinian art dealer
 Carlos M. Rivera, 27th Fire Commissioner of the City of New York
 Carlos Manuel Rivera (born 1978), American boxer
 Carlos Rafael Rivera (born 1970), composer
 Carlos Rivera (basketball) (born 1983), Puerto Rican basketball player
 Charlie Masso (Carlos Javier Rivera Masso, born 1969), Puerto Rican singer and actor
 Charlie Rivera (baseball) (Carlos Lavezzari Rivera, 1911–2003), Puerto Rican baseball player
 Carlos Rivera, a character in the TV drama 7th Heaven
 Carlos Rivera, a character in the manga and anime Ashita no Joe

See also
 Carlos Rivero (disambiguation)